Charter of Hilandar is the founding charter of the Hilandar monastery, the cradle of the Serbian Orthodox Church and main endowment of Stefan Nemanja and Saint Sava. It was written in 1198, while the second revision, of Stefan the First-Crowned in 1200–01.

Until 1896, the oldest Serbian charter in the Hilandar archives was the founding charter of Hilandar, while the oldest manuscript book in the Hilandar library was Miroslav's Gospel.

Both charters are written in Serbian recension of Church Slavonic (literary) language, but the vernacular is present in the parts where the gifts to Hilandar are discussed. The original version of Stefan II's revision is located in the Hilandar.

See also
Hilandar Typikon
Karyes Typikon
Serbian manuscripts

References

Sources

External links

Hilandar
1198 establishments in Europe
12th-century establishments in Serbia
History of the Serbian Orthodox Church
Medieval Athos
Athos manuscripts
Nemanjić dynasty
Hilandar Monastery